U-ka saegusa IN db II is the second studio album by Japanese group U-ka Saegusa in dB. The album  was released on November 17, 2004 under Giza Studio label.

Background
The album includes 4 previously released singles since Nemuru Kimi no Yokogao ni Hohoemi wo till Itsuka Kokoro ni Taiyou wo. The composer of Egao de Iyouyo, Aika Ohno self-cover this single in her cover album Silent Passage.

Charting performance
The album reached #23 rank in Oricon for first week. It charted for 4 weeks and totally sold 20,814 copies.

Track listing

Usage in media
The song Nemuru Kimi no Yokogao ni Hohoemi wo was used as ending theme for Anime television Detective Conan
The song Itsuka Kokoro ni Taiyou wo was used as ending theme for program Ultraman Nexus aired at Tokyo Broadcasting System Television
The song Hekonda Kimochi Tokasu Kimi was used as ending theme for program TV oja Manbou aired at Nippon TV
The song Egao de Iyouyo was used as ending theme for program AX MUSIC-TV aired at Nippon TV

References

2004 albums
Being Inc. albums
Giza Studio albums
Japanese-language albums
U-ka Saegusa in dB albums
Albums produced by Daiko Nagato